Morituri is a 1948 German black-and-white drama film produced by Artur Brauner's  CCC Film. The film was directed by Eugen York and starred Walter Richter, Winnie Markus and Lotte Koch. It features the onscreen debut of German actor Klaus Kinski as a Dutch concentration camp prisoner.

Plot
As the end of the Second World War approaches and the Soviet Red Army is advancing, a group of concentration camp inmates is helped to escape by a Polish doctor. They hide in a wood where they meet other fugitives, who have been there for months, constantly in fear of being discovered. Out of fear of the German army patrols, they do not dare to leave the forest, even as the food supplies run low. The Polish doctor blows up a bridge, attracting the German troops' attention to the forest. The soldiers come perilously close to the hidden fugitives, but in the last moment have to retreat before the approaching Red Army units.

Cast
 Walter Richter as Dr. Leon Bronek
 Winnie Markus as Maria Bronek
 Lotte Koch as Lydia
 Hilde Körber as Insane Woman
 Catja Görna as Stascha Sokol
 Josef Sieber as Eddy
 Carl-Heinz Schroth as Armand
 Siegmar Schneider as Gerhard Tenborg
 Peter Marx as Pjotr, Russian
 Alfred Cogho as Roy, Canadian
 Joseph Almas as Dr. Simon (as Josef Almas)
 Ellinor Saul-Gerlach as Lucie, his daughter (as Ellinor Saul)
 Ursula Bergmann as Ruth, his daughter
 Willy Prager as Father Simon
 Annemarie Hase as Mother Simon
 Karl Vibach as Georg, German Soldier
 Bob Kleinmann as Janek, 12 years
 Michael Günther as Wladek, 16 years
 Erich Dunskus as Sokol, Polish Farmer
 David Minster as The Invalid
 Franja Kamienietzka as Mrs Steppan
 Klaus Kinski as Dutch Prisoner

Production
The title comes from the Latin expression Ave Imperator, morituri te salutant. Making this film was a very personal project for Artur Brauner. The script is based on an idea of his and this was only the second film made by his company CCC Film. Exteriors were shot near Berlin in Brandenburg, interiors at the Tempelhof Studios. Principal cinematography was from September 1947 to January 1948.

Reception
The film was first shown on 28 August 1948 at the Venice Film Festival on the Lido di Venezia, Italy.

It premiered in the Waterloo-Theater, Hamburg, Germany on 24 September 1948. It was released at the Neues Scala Kino in Berlin on 16 November 1948. The film was a commercial disaster, with audiences hissing and booing. A theater in Hamburg was vandalized, after which other theater owners, fearful of reprisal by Nazi sympathizers, refused to show the film. It was called Freiwild in Austria.

Morituri was aired on German television station ZDF on 7 April 1991.

In 2009 Artur Brauner donated the film to Yad Vashem along with 20 other Holocaust-related films he had produced.

References

External links
 
 
 
 Artur Brauner-Archiv at the Deutsches Filmmuseum, containing the production files for this film (German)

1948 films
1948 drama films
1940s German-language films
German drama films
West German films
German black-and-white films
Films directed by Eugen York
German World War II films
Films shot at Tempelhof Studios